General Haig may refer to:

Alexander Haig (1924–2010), first U.S. Secretary of State under Ronald Reagan
Brodie Haig (1886–1957), British Indian Army general
Douglas Haig, 1st Earl Haig (1861–1928), commander of the British Expeditionary Force during much of the First World War